The following is a list of notable Shia Muslims.

Scientists, mathematicians and academics

Ibn Sina or Avicenna-  was a Persian polymathwho is regarded as one of the most significant physicians, astronomers, philosophers, and writers of the Islamic Golden Age, and the father of early modern medicine.
Muḥammad ibn Mūsā al-Khwārizmī-inventor of Algebra and regarded as the father of Mathematics, was a Persian polymath from Khwarazm, who produced vastly influential works in mathematics, astronomy, and geography.
Munib Maglajlić - Bosnian historian of literature
Melika Salihbegović - Bosnian writer and intellectual
Ali ibn Ridwan – Egyptian Muslim physician, astrologer, astronomer, philosopher
Al-ʻIjliyyah – 10th-century female maker of astrolabes
Ibn al-Nadim –  10th century bibliophile of Baghdad and compiler of the Arabic bibliographic-biographic encyclopedia Kitāb al-Fihrist ('The Book Catalogue')
Hamid al-Din al-Kirmani – Persian philosopher
Sharaf al-Dīn al-Ṭūsī – astronomer, mathematician
Bahāʾ al-dīn al-ʿĀmilī – Arab Shia Islamic scholar, philosopher, architect, mathematician, astronomer and poet who lived in the late 16th and early 17th centuries.
Mo'ayyeduddin Urdi – Arab Muslim astronomer, mathematician, architect and engineer
Ibn al-Tiqtaqa – Iraqi Arab Muslim historian
Iskandar Beg Munshi – court historian of the Safavid emperor Shah Abbas I
Mirza Mehdi Khan Astarabadi – chief secretary, historian, biographer, advisor, strategist.
Mulla Sadra – philosopher, founder of existentialism and transcendent theosophy
Mir Damad – Iranian philosopher
Hassan Kamel Al-Sabbah – electrical and electronics research engineer, mathematician and inventor.
Rammal Rammal – Lebanese condensed matter physicist
Allama Rasheed Turabi – Hyderabad, India later migrated to Pakistan theologian, scholar, philosopher
Sadiq Kamani – Indian public & Motivational Speaker
Kazem Behbehani – Kuwaiti immunologist and retired professor. He has done research on tropical diseases before he became an international health advocate at WHO.
Lotfi Asker Zadeh – Iranian computer scientist; founder of fuzzy mathematics and fuzzy set theory.
Cumrun Vafa – Iranian-American theoretical physicist at Harvard, Winner of Breakthrough Prize 
Nima Arkani-Hamed – Iranian-American theoretical physicist at Princeton, winner of Breakthrough Prize 
Ehsan Afshari – Professor of Electrical Engineering and Computer Science at the University of Michigan
Ali Javan – Iranian-American physicist and inventor 
Yasaman Farzan – Iranian theoretical physicist 
Saba Valadkhan – Iranian biomedical researcher 
Fereydoon Family – Iranian physicist 
Mahmoud Hessaby – Iranian physicist 
Iraj Malekpour – Iranian physicist
Mehran Kardar – theoretical physicist, MIT 
Omid Kordestani – senior vice president, Worldwide Sales and Fields Operations, Google
Ali Hajimiri – Caltech, co-founder of Axiom Microdevices 
Payam Heydari – electrical engineer and computer scientist, University of California Irvine 
Ali Khademhosseini – Iranian-American-Canadian biomedical engineer at Harvard
Babak Hassibi – electrical engineer, Caltech
Caro Lucas – Iranian Armenian scientist
Ali Chamseddine – Lebanese theoretical physicist    
Wissam S. al-Hashimi – Iraqi geologist
Husain Mohammad Jafri – academician
Athar Ali – Pakistani system engineer and a rocket scientist
Pervez Hoodbhoy – nuclear physicist and activist
Agha Shahi – diplomat and technocrat
Razi Abedi – literary figure, activist and scholar of Pakistan
Nayyar Ali Zaidi – Pakistani architect
Kalbe Razi Naqvi – British Pakistani physicist
Aziz Sancar – American scientist
Ahmed Zewail – American chemist

Historical political figures

Late Islamic history
Syed Muhammad Mir Ali Naqvi – Chief Justice of the court of Akbar the Great, Mir Adal; served on the court, 1579–1581; governor of Sindh
Hasan ibn Zayd – founder of the Alavids dynasty
Al-Hadi ila'l-Haqq Yahya – founder of the Zaidi imamate State
Sayf al-Daula – ruler of the Hamdanid dynasty (945–967)
Mu'izz al-Daula – ruler of the Buyid dynasty (945–967)
Abu 'Abdullah al-Shi'i – a Da'i for the Isma'ilis in Yemen and North Africa mainly among the Kutama Berbers, whose teachings influenced the rise of the Fatimid dynasty
Ubayd Allah al-Mahdi Billah – founder of the Fatimid dynasty
Al-Muizz Lideenillah – fourth Fatimid Caliph Founder of the city of Cairo
Sitt al-Mulk – ruler of the Fatimids (1021–1023); elder sister of Al-Hakim
Arwa al-Sulayhi – ruler, first through her two husbands and then alone, of Yemen
Sharifa Fatima – Zaydi chief in 15th-century Yemen
Salih ibn Mirdas – founder of the Mirdasids emirate
Muhammad ibn al-Musayyib – founder of the Uqaylid Dynasty
Tekuder – first Muslim Khan of Ilkhanate
Ghazan – ruler of the Ilkhanate dynasty (1295–1304)
Öljaitü – eighth Ilkhanate ruler
Uzun Hassan – ruler of the Ak Koyunlu dynasty (1453–1478)
Ismail I – founder of the Safavid dynasty
Abbas I of Persia – ruler of the Safavid dynasty (1588–1629)
Karim Khan – founder of the Zand dynasty

Poets

Ali ibn Ridwan – Egyptian Muslim physician, astrologer, astronomer, philosopher
Al-ʻIjliyyah – 10th-century female maker of astrolabes
Ibn al-Nadim –  10th century bibliophile of Baghdad and compiler of the Arabic bibliographic-biographic encyclopedia Kitāb al-Fihrist ('The Book Catalogue')
Hamid al-Din al-Kirmani – Persian philosopher
Sharaf al-Dīn al-Ṭūsī – astronomer, mathematician
Bahāʾ al-dīn al-ʿĀmilī – Arab Shia Islamic scholar, philosopher, architect, mathematician, astronomer and poet who lived in the late 16th and early 17th centuries.
Mo'ayyeduddin Urdi – Arab Muslim astronomer, mathematician, architect and engineer
Ibn al-Tiqtaqa – Iraqi Arab Muslim historian
Iskandar Beg Munshi – court historian of the Safavid emperor Shah Abbas I
Mirza Mehdi Khan Astarabadi – chief secretary, historian, biographer, advisor, strategist.
Mulla Sadra – philosopher, founder of existentialism and transcendent theosophy
Mir Damad – Iranian philosopher
Hassan Kamel Al-Sabbah – electrical and electronics research engineer, mathematician and inventor.
Rammal Rammal – Lebanese condensed matter physicist
Allama Rasheed Turabi – Hyderabad, India later migrated to Pakistan theologian, scholar, philosopher
Kazem Behbehani – Kuwaiti immunologist and retired professor. He has done research on tropical diseases before he became an international health advocate at WHO.
Lotfi Asker Zadeh – Iranian computer scientist; founder of fuzzy mathematics and fuzzy set theory.
Cumrun Vafa – Iranian-American theoretical physicist at Harvard, Winner of Breakthrough Prize 
Nima Arkani-Hamed – Iranian-American theoretical physicist at Princeton, winner of Breakthrough Prize 
Ali Javan – Iranian-American physicist and inventor 
Yasaman Farzan – Iranian theoretical physicist 
Saba Valadkhan – Iranian biomedical researcher 
Fereydoon Family – Iranian physicist 
Mahmoud Hessaby – Iranian physicist 
Iraj Malekpour – Iranian physicist
Mehran Kardar – theoretical physicist, MIT 
Omid Kordestani – Senior Vice President, Worldwide Sales and Fields Operations, Google
Ali Hajimiri – Caltech, co-founder of Axiom Microdevices 
Payam Heydari – electrical engineer and computer scientist, University of California Irvine 
Ali Khademhosseini – Iranian-American-Canadian biomedical engineer at Harvard
Babak Hassibi – electrical engineer, Caltech
Caro Lucas – Iranian Armenian scientist
Ali Chamseddine – Lebanese theoretical physicist    
Wissam S. al-Hashimi – Iraqi geologist
Husain Mohammad Jafri – academician
Athar Ali – Pakistani system engineer and a rocket scientist
Pervez Hoodbhoy – nuclear physicist and activist
Agha Shahi – diplomat and technocrat
Razi Abedi – literary figure, activist and scholar of Pakistan
Nayyar Ali Zaidi – Pakistani architect
Kalbe Razi Naqvi – British Pakistani physicist

Poets and writers

Syed Ali Haider Nazam Tabatabai – translated Thomas Gray's Elegy Written in a Country Churchyard from poem to poem in Urdu. (1854 Luckhnow-1933 Hyderabad Deccan India). He was head of Translation Department of Usmania University, could speak write and understand English, German, French, Persian and Arabic.

Mir Anis – classical Urdu poet and master of the elegies in honor of the tragedy of Karbala known as Marsiya which was instrumental in the propagation of azadari, or mourning of Muharram in South Asia
Mirza Dabeer – Urdu poet and master of the Marsiya, contemporary, friend, and rival of Mir Anis
Safi al-din al-Hilli (1278 – c. 1349) – Iraqi poet
Muhammad Mahdi Al-Jawahiri – Iraqi poet
Abdullah Al-Baradouni – Yemeni writer and poet
Ebrahim Al-Arrayedh – Bahrani poet
Qassim Haddad – Bahrani poet, researcher, writer
Ali Al Jallawi – Bahrani poet
Badawi al-Jabal – Syrian poet
Qurratulain Hyder – (She was Sunni but widely thought of as shia because of her name, Hyder..) female novelist and writer regarded as the "Grande Dame of Urdu literature"
Ali Akbar Natiq – Pakistani poet and writer
Adunis – Syrian poet and writer
Muhammed Almagut – Syrian poet and writer
Badr Shakir al-Sayyab – Iraqi poet
Nazik Al-Malaika – influential contemporary Iraqi female poet
Bint al-Huda – Iraqi educator and political activist
Hasan Zyko Kamberi – Albanian poet and writer
Naim Frashëri – Albanian poet and writer
Sami Frashëri – Albanian poet and writer
Abdyl Frashëri – Albanian poet and writer
Shahriar – Iranian poet
Agha Shahid Ali – Kashmiri-American poet

Professionals

Fakhruddin T. Khorakiwala – Indian businessman and Sheriff of Mumbai
Dr. Ilham Zaidi - Epidemiologist and Public Health Specialist from India
Muhammad Hussain Inoki – Japanese retired professional wrestler, martial artist, politician, and promoter of professional wrestling and mixed martial arts
Tabish Hussain – English footballer

Politicians

Albania
Xhafer Bej Ypi – former prime minister of Albania
Mehdi Bej Frashëri – former prime minister of Albania
Ibrahim Biçakçiu – former prime minister of Albania

Azerbaijan
Heydar Aliyev – former president of Azerbaijan
Ilham Aliyev – current president of Azerbaijan
Ali Asadov – current prime minister of Azerbaijan
Vilayət Eyvazov – current union home minister

Bahrain
Abdul Amir al-Jamri – 'spiritual leader' of Bahrain's Twelver Shi'a population and the 1990s Intifada
Hasan Mushaima – secretary-general of the current Haq Movement
Ali Salman – secretary-general of the current Al-Wefaq
Abdulhadi Al Khawaja – leading Bahraini human rights activist
Nabeel Rajab – president of the Bahrain Center for Human Rights

Bangladesh
 Nawab Ali Abbas Khan, Jatiya Party politician and three-time MP for Maulvibazar-2
 Nawab Ali Haider Khan, 9th Nawab of Longla, minister and leader of the Independent Muslim Party

India
Dr.(Capt) Sikander Rizvi - Renowned Pilot, Politician and Nationalist Speaker
Fazl Ali – governor and justice of Supreme Court Of India
Kaifi Azmi – poet
Tanveer Zaidi - actor

Bismillah Khan – musician
Saiyid Nurul Hasan – professor
Altamas Kabir
Ayatullah Syed Abul Hasan Rizvi Kishmiri – Shia Mujtah
Ayatullah Syed Mohammad Baqir Rizvi – Shia jurist
Syed_Aqeel-ul-Gharavi – Shia Cleric and Scholar
Syed Kirmani
Dr.Syed Roshan Abbas – Shia politician
Mir Anis - Famous Urdu  Poet (Marsiya Writer) 
Mirza Dabeer - Famous Urdu Poet (Marsiya Writer) 
Mohammad Islam Khan -  Indian glycobiologist and a scientist at the National Chemical Laboratory
Mirza Muhammad Rafi Sauda
Javed Abidi
Nawab of Banganapalle
Nawab of Masulipatam
Intezar Abidi – politician
Sir Sultan Ahmed
Mir Sadiq
Sadiq Kamani - Public & Motivational Speaker
Sayyed Mahmud Khan
Kamal Amrohi
Shabana Azmi
Azim Premji – Indian business tycoon
Syed Shahnawaz Hussain – former union cabinet minister of Government of India
Syed Kirmani – cricketer
Bade Ghulam Ali Khan – singer
Nawab of Rampur – king
Nawab of Lucknow – king
Nargis Dutt – actress
Naushad – music director
Salim–Sulaiman – musician
Jagdeep
M. A. Yusuff Ali - Indian Billionaire Businessman 
Muzaffar Ali
Farah Naaz
Akbar Khan
Mukhtar Abbas Naqvi – Union Minister govt. India
M. F. Hussain – painter
S. H. Raza – painter
Salim Ali – ornithologist
Saeed Naqvi – journalist
Syed Ahmed – Governor of Jharkhand
Mohsin Zaidi – poet
Molvi Iftikhar Hussain Ansari - Shia scholar and politician
Molvi Imran Raza Ansari - Shia scholar and politician
Aga Syed Mustafa Moosavi – Shia scholar

Iran
Amir Kabir – Prime Minister of Persia under Nasereddin Shah
Mohammad Reza Pahlavi – last Shah of Iran from 1941 until his overthrow due to the 1979 Iranian Revolution
Mohammed Mosaddeq – former prime minister of Iran
Ruhollah Khomeini – marja, philosopher and leader of the 1979 Iranian Revolution
Ali Khamenei – marja, third president and current supreme leader of Iran
Mehdi Bazargan – former prime minister of Iran
Mohammad-Javad Bahonar – former prime minister of Iran (killed by terrorists)
Abolhassan Banisadr – first president of Iran following the Iranian Revolution
Mohammad-Ali Rajai − second president of Iran (killed by terrorists)
Mostafa Chamran – Iranian defense minister, first commander of the Pasdaran and founding member of the Freedom Movement of Iran
Akbar Hashemi Rafsanjani – fourth president of Iran and current head of the Expediency Discernment Council
Mohammad Khatami – leading reformist Iranian politician and fifth president of Iran
Mahmoud Ahmadinejad – sixth president of Iran and former mayor of Tehran
Hassan Rouhani – seventh and current president of Iran and former chief nuclear negotiator
Ali Larijani – Iranian philosopher and speaker of the Iranian parliament
Ali Akbar Mohtashami-Pur – reformist Iranian politician and coordinator of Hezbollah in its early days

Iraq
Muhammad Fadhel al-Jamali – Iraqi foreign minister, and Prime Minister of Iraq
Naji Talib – former prime minister of Iraq
Ezzedine Salim – former Iraqi politician
Ibrahim al-Jaafari – former prime minister of Iraq
Nouri al-Maliki – former prime minister of Iraq
haider al-Abadi – current prime minister of Iraq
Adil Abdul-Mahdi – Iraqi Shi'a politician, economist
Mohammed Baqir al-Hakim – former leader of Islamic Supreme Council of Iraq
Abdul Aziz al-Hakim – leader of Islamic Supreme Council of Iraq
Jalal al-Din Ali al-Saghir – Iraqi politician and a member of parliament in the Islamic Supreme Council of Iraq
Mohammad Bahr al-Ulloum – prominent Twelver Shi'a Islamic leader and politician in Iraq
Muqtada al-Sadr –  Iraqi politician and head of the Mahdi Army
Ahmed Chalabi –  Iraqi politician
Abbas al-Bayati –  Iraqi Shiite Turkmen politician
Jasim Mohammed Jaafar –  Iraqi Shiite Turkmen politician
Hussain al-Shahristani – current Iraqi minister of oil
Shirwan al-Waili – current Iraqi minister of state for national security
Mowaffak al-Rubaie – current Iraqi national security advisor
Baqir Jabr al-Zubeidi – current finance minister of Iraq
Khaled al-Attiyah -elected First Deputy Speaker of the Iraqi National Assembly
Salama al-Khufaji – former member of the Council of Representatives of Iraq
Safia Taleb Ali al-Suhail –  Iraqi politician and a member of the Council of Representatives of Iraq

Kuwait
Adnan Zahid Abdulsamad – member of the National Assembly of Kuwait
Ahmed Lari – member of the National Assembly of Kuwait
Ali Hussain Al-Awadhi – journalist and politician
Hussein Al-Qallaf Al-Bahraini – member of the National Assembly of Kuwait
Hassan Jawhar – member of the National Assembly of Kuwait
Rola Dashti – member of the National Assembly of Kuwait
Ibrahim Khraibut – member of first National Assembly of Kuwait
Massouma al-Mubarak – Kuwait's first female minister
Ibtihal Al-Khatib – secular academic and politician
Saleh Ashour – member of the Kuwaiti parliament
Hassan Jawhar – member of the Kuwaiti parliament

Lebanon
Adel Osseiran – one of the founders of modern Lebanon
Musa al-Sadr – contemporary Islamic philosopher and co-founder of the Amal Movement
Muhammad Hussein Fadlallah (also Muhammad Husayn Fadl-Allāh or Sayyed Muhammad Hussein Fadl-Allāh) (born 1935)  – prominent Lebanese Twelver Shi'a Muslim cleric
Hussein el-Husseini – former speaker of the Lebanese Parliament, co-founder of the Amal Movement, fathered the Taif Agreement that led to the end of the Lebanese Civil War
Nabih Berri – Speaker of the Parliament of Lebanon; head of the mostly Shi'a Amal Movement
Abbas Musawi – former secretary-general of Hezbollah
Hassan Nasrallah – Secretary-General of Hezbollah
Imad Mughniyah – former head of Hezbollah's external security apparatus
Ali Qanso – former secretary-general of Syrian Social Nationalist Party
Ali Eid – Secretary-General of Arabic Democratic Party

Pakistan
Muhammad Ali Jinnah- first governor-general of Pakistan 
Iskander Mirza – first president of Pakistan
Muhammad Musa – Pakistan's Chief of Army Staff during 1965 Indo Pak war and later Governor of Balauchistan
Nayyar Hussain Bukhari – Chairman of Senate of Pakistan
Syed Mehdi Shah – former chief minister of GB Province
Haider Abbas Rizvi
Fakhar Imam
Makhdoom Faisal Saleh Hayat
Faisal Sabzwari
Ali Zaidi
Firdous Ashiq Awan
Mushahid Hussain
Shehla Raza
Qaim Ali Shah
Murad Ali Shah
Mamnoon Hussain
  Tahir Hussain Mashhadi
  Zulfi Bukhari
 

Advocate Chairman Collages
Scholars'
Grand Ayatullah Hafiz Bashir Husseyn Najafi
Grand Ayatullah Muhammad Hussain Najafi – Sargodha
Allama Arif Hussain Al-Hussaini
Allama Sajid Ali Naqvi – Quaid e Millat e Jaffaria

Syria
Zaki al-Arsuzi – Syrian political activist and writer
Assad Family – Syrian political family who are ruling Syria since the 1970s

Yemen
Yahya Muhammad Hamid ed-Din – founder of the Mutawakkilite Kingdom of Yemen
Ibrahim al-Hamadi – former president of Yemen
Hussein Badreddin al-Houthi – Zaidi religious leader

Rulers and military figures

Earlier
Sayf al-Daula – ruler of the Hamdanid dynasty (945–967)
Gawhar al-Siqilli – the most important military leader in the Fatimid history; led the conquest of North Africa and then of Egypt, founded the city of Cairo and the great al-Azhar mosque
Ziri ibn Manad – founder of the Zirid dynasty in the Maghreb
Buluggin ibn Ziri – the first ruler of the Zirids in Ifriqiya
Al-Mansur ibn Buluggin – the second ruler of the Zirids in Ifriqiya
Badis ibn Mansur – the third ruler of the Zirids in Ifriqiya
Abu Zayd al-Hilali – the 11th-century Arab leader and hero of the 'Amirid tribe of Banu Hilal
Al-Afdal Shahanshah – a vizier of the Fatimid caliphs of Egypt
Iftikhar ad-Daula – the Fatimid governor of Jerusalem during the siege of Jerusalem
Shawar – a ruler of Egypt, the vizier
Hassan-i Sabbah – founded a group whose members are sometimes referred to as the Hashshashin
Rashid ad-Din Sinan – one of the leaders of the Syrian wing of the Hashshashin sect and an important figure in the history of the Crusades

Azerbaijan
Surat Huseynov – Azerbaijani colonel and ex-prime minister of Azerbaijan
Eldar Mahmudov – head of the Azerbaijani Ministry of National Security
Rail Rzayev – former head of the Azerbaijani Air Force

India
Ali Adil Shah I of Bijapur (16th C), but his successors converted to Sunni Islam
Wajid Ali Shah – last nawab of the princely kingdom of Awadh, early 19th Century
Muhammad Quli Qutb Shah – 5th sultan of the Qutb Shahi Sultanate of Golconda

Iran
Ali Khamenei – marja, third president and current supreme leader of Iran
Ruhollah Khomeini – marja, philosopher and leader of the 1979 Iranian Revolution
Mohammad Reza Pahlavi – the last shah of Iran of the Pahlavi dynasty, ruled from 1941 until being overthrown in the Iranian Revolution resulting in the abolishment of the Iranian monarchy
Reza Shah Pahlavi – Shah of Iran from 1925 to 1941, and father of Mohammad Reza Pahlavi
Hassan-i Sabbah – founded a group whose members are sometimes referred to as the Hashshashin
Allahverdi Khan – Iranian military and political leader of Georgian origin
Imam-Quli Khan – Iranian general and statesman of Georgian origin
Nader Shah – Shah of Iran during the Afsharid dynasty notable for his Naderian Wars, and conversion dominant belief system from Safavid ideology to Jafari fiqh
Abbas Mirza – Qajar crown prince of Persia
Gholamali Bayandor – first Commander of Imperial Iranian Navy
Abbas Gharabaghi – last commander-in-chief of the Imperial Iranian Army
Mohsen Rezaee – Chief commander of AGIR, 1981–1997
Yahya Rahim Safavi – Chief commander of AGIR, 1997–2007
Mohammad Ali Jafari – Chief commander of AGIR
Ali Shamkhani – former defense minister of Iran
Mostafa Mohammad-Najjar – current defense minister of Iran
Ali Sayad Shirazi – chief-of-staff of the Iranian forces during Iran's eight-year war with Iraq
Mohammad Boroujerdi – one of the founders of Islamic Revolutionary Guard Corps (AGIR) and a commander in Iran–Iraq War; played key roles in regaining control over the territories of Kurdistan by Iranian forces
Hossein Kharrazi – Iranian commander of "Imam Hosein 14th Division" during Iran–Iraq War

Iraq
Abdel-Karim Mahoud al-Mohammedawi – led the resistance against Saddam Hussein's government in the southern marsh regions of Iraq, where he gained the title "Prince of the Marshes"
Hadi Al-Amiri – head of the Badr Organization, which was the military wing of the Supreme Islamic Iraqi Council
Aras Habib – a colonel in the Free Iraqi Fighters
Abud Qanbar – former military governor of Baghdad

Lebanon
Adham Khanjar – Lebanese national hero
Mohammad Zgheib – 1948 Arab–Israeli War war hero
Hisham Jaber – former military governor of Beirut
Imad Mughniyah – former head of Hezbollah's external security apparatus
Sana'a Mehaidli – Lebanese martyr
Samir Kuntar – Lebanese militant and a former member of the Palestine Liberation Front

Syria
Sayf al-Daula – ruler of the Hamdanid dynasty (945–967)
Rashid ad-Din Sinan – one of the leaders of the Syrian wing of the Hashshashin sect and an important figure in the history of the Crusades
Saleh al-Ali – commanded one of the first rebellions against the French mandate of Syria
Salah Jadid – Syrian general and political figure in the Baath Party
Assef Shawqat – head of the Syrian Military Intelligence apparatus since 2005
Maher al-Assad –  brother of Syrian president Bashar al-Assad; head of the Presidential Guard
Ghazi Kanaan – Syria's interior minister, 2004–2005; long-time head of Syria's security apparatus in Lebanon
Hisham Ikhtiyar – director of the GID, 2001–2005

Yemen
Abdul-Malik al-Houthi – leader of Shi'a Zaidi
Abdullah al-Ruzami – leader of Shi'a Zaidi

Theologians

Al-Shaykh al-Saduq
Al-Shaykh Al-Mufid
al-Sharif al-Murtada
Muhammad ibn Ya'qub al-Kulayni
Shaykh Tusi
Al-Hurr al-Aamili
Shahid Awwal
Shahid Thani
Qazi Nurullah Shustari (Shahid Salis)
Shahid Rabay
Maitham Al Bahrani – 13th-century cleric and theologian
Al-Hilli – 13th-century cleric and theologian

Religious figures
Agha Muhammad Reza – Iranian Shia Muslim immigrant living in the Sylhet region of Bengal. Claimed to be the Mahdi and twelfth imam, engaged in battles against the East India Company and Kachari Kingdom.
Salih Al-Karzakani – 17th-century cleric
Muhammad Baqir Majlisi – 17th-century cleric
Abdullah al Samahiji – 18th-century cleric
Yusuf Al Bahrani – 18th-century cleric
Allamah Ibrahim el-Zakzaky – influential Shia cleric in Africa; leader of Islamic Movement in Nigeria
Allama Syed Jawad Naqvi – Religious Leader and influential Shia Scholar in Pakistan
Ayatollah Mahmoud Taleghani – cleric, head of the Council of Islamic revolution and founding member of the Freedom Movement of Iran
Mohammad Baqir al-Sadr – Islamic philosopher, father of contemporary Islamic economics and founder of the Islamic Dawa Party
Allameh Tabatabaei – one of the most prominent Islamic philosophers and, at one point, the foremost source of emulation (Marja) for Shi'a Muslims around the world
Grand Ayatollah Sayyed Mohammad Hussein Fadlallah – foremost marja of Lebanese Shi'a Muslims
Navvab Safavi – founder of the militant group Fadayan-e Islam
Grand Ayatollah Ali al-Sistani – currently the pre-eminent marja of Shi'a Muslims around the world and arguably the most influential political figure in Iraq today
Ahmad Huseinzadeh – third Sheikh ul-Islam of the Caucasus
Grand Ayatollah Muhsin al-Hakim – sole Shi'a marja in the early 1960s
Grand Ayatollah Abu al-Qasim al-Khoei – Shi'a marja
Grand Ayatollah Mohammad Mohammad Sadeq al-Sadr – Shi'a marja
Grand Ayatollah Hossein-Ali Montazeri – Shi'a marja
Ahmed Al-Waeli – one of the most well-known Shi'a Islamic prominent clerks in the 20th century
Aga Khan IV – imam of the Nizari Ismaili tariqah of Shia Islam
Sa'id Akhtar Rizvi – well-known Twelver Shia scholar who promoted Shia Islam in East Africa
Syed Ali Akhtar Rizvi – well-known Twelver Shī'ah scholar, speaker, author, historian and poet
 Allama Talib Jauhari
 Mohsin Naqvi – Urdu poet of Pakistan
 Allama Sayyed Imdad Husayn Kazmi al-Mashadi - Pakistani Shi'a scholar who wrote tafsir of Qur'an (Qur'an ul-Mubeen, https://www.scribd.com/document/391093948/Quran-Ul-Mubeen-by-Syed-Imdad-Hussain-Kazmi)

Famous Shias
Rajab Bursi – Arab Shi'ite theologian and mystic
Sayyid Baraka – spiritual teacher and friend to the 14th-century warlord Timur
Mir Shamsuddin – Iraqi missionary.
Shah Ni'matullah Wali – Islamic scholar and poet
Safi-ad-din Ardabili – eponym of the Safavid dynasty
Abba Yahiyya Ishmaili
Baba Rexheb Albanian Bektashi

Modern and contemporary philosophers

Morteza Motahhari – Iranian cleric, philosopher and politician
Hossein Nasr – Islamic philosopher and professor of Islamic studies at George Washington University
Muhammad Legenhausen – modern Shi'a Muslim philosopher of German American background, PhD at Rice University

Entertainment and media personalities

 Ali Abbas Naqvi – Indian  Journalist -NDTV

 Asghar Farhadi – Iranian film director and screenwriter
 Abdulhussain Abdulredha – Kuwaiti actor and writer
 Ali Haider – Pakistani singer; now Islamic singer
 Mohammad Reza Sharifinia – Iranian actor
 Zainab Bahrani – Iraqi art historian
 Shahriar Bahrani – Iranian film director
 Abbas Fahdel – Iraqi film director.
 Mir Sarwar – Indian actor.
 Mohamed Al-Daradji – Iraqi Dutch film director
 Hassan Massoudy – Iraqi calligrapher
 Ahmed Al Safi – Iraqi artist
 Nedim Kufi – Iraqi artist
 Sadequain – Pakistani artist
 Usama Alshaibi – Iraqi-American independent filmmaker, visual and media artist
 Jagdeep – Syed Jawahar Ali Jaffery, comedy actor in early Indian cinema
 Farida Mohammad Ali – Iraqi singer
 Naseer Shamma – Iraqi musician and oud player
 Imran Abbas Naqvi – Pakistani actor
 Sadegh Tirafkan – Iranian contemporary artist
 Khosrow Vaziri – Iranian professional wrestler, retired
 Rahat Kazmi – Pakistani actor, professional speaker and academician
 Zulfiqar Mirza – Pakistani politician
 Zain Imam – Indian television actor

Other

Edoardo Agnelli – son of Gianni Agnelli and former heir to Fiat
Qasem Soleimani – Iranian General

See also
 International rankings of Iran in science and technology
 Lists of Maraji

References

Shia Islam
List
Shi'a
Shi'a